Volleyball events were contested at the 2007 Summer Universiade in Bangkok, Thailand.

References
 Men's competition results on Sports123.com
 Women's competition results on Sports123.com

U
2007 Summer Universiade
Volleyball at the Summer Universiade